Cottaging is a gay slang term, originating from the United Kingdom, referring to anonymous sex between men in a public lavatory (a "cottage", "tea-room"), or cruising for sexual partners with the intention of having sex elsewhere. The term has its roots in self-contained English toilet blocks resembling small cottages in their appearance; in the English cant language of Polari this became a double entendre by gay men referring to sexual encounters. See also gay beat in Australian English.

The word "cottage", usually meaning a small, cosy, countryside home, is documented as having been in use during the Victorian era to refer to a public toilet and by the 1960s its use in this sense had become an exclusively homosexual slang term. This usage is predominantly British, though the term is occasionally used with the same meaning in other parts of the world. Among gay men in the United States, lavatories used for this purpose are called tea rooms.

Locations
Cottages were and are located in places heavily used by many people such as bus stations, railway stations, airports and university campuses. Often, glory holes are drilled in the walls between cubicles in popular cottages. Foot signals—tapping a foot, sliding a foot slightly under the divider between stalls, attracting the attention of the occupant of the next stall—are used to signify that one wishes to connect with the person in the next cubicle. In some heavily used cottages, an etiquette develops and one person may function as a lookout to warn if non-cottagers are coming.

Since the 1980s, more individuals in authority have become more aware of the existence of cottages in places under their jurisdiction and have reduced the height of or even removed doors from the cubicles of popular cottages, or extended the walls between the cubicles to the floor to prevent foot signalling.

Cottages as meeting places
Before the gay liberation movement, many, if not most, gay and bisexual men at the time were closeted and there were almost no public gay social groups for those under legal drinking age. As such, cottages were among the few places where men too young to get into gay bars could meet others whom they knew to be gay.

The internet brought significant changes to cottaging, which was previously an activity engaged in by men with other men, often in silence with no communication beyond the markings of a cubicle wall. Today, an online community is being established in which men exchange details of locations, discussing aspects such as when it receives the highest traffic, when it is safest and to facilitate sexual encounters by arranging meeting times. The term cybercottage is used by some gay and bisexual men who use the role-play and nostalgia of cottaging in a virtual space or as a notice board to arrange real life anonymous sexual encounters.

Laud Humphrey's Tearoom Trade, published in 1970, was a sociological analysis and observance between the social space public "restrooms" (as toilets are euphemistically known in the US) offer for anonymous sex and the men—either closeted, gay, or straight—who sought to fulfill sexual desires that their wives, religion, or social lives could not. The study, which was met with praise on one side due to its innovation and criticism on the other due to having outed "straight" men and risked their privacy, brought to light the multidimensionality of public restrooms and the intricacy and complexity of homosexual sex amongst self-identifying straight men.

Legal status
Sexual acts in public lavatories are outlawed by many jurisdictions. It is likely that the element of risk involved in cottaging makes it an attractive activity to some.

Historically, in the United Kingdom, public gay sex often resulted in a charge and conviction of gross indecency, an offence only pertaining to sexual acts committed by males and particularly applied to homosexual activity. Anal penetration was a separate and much more serious crime that came under the definition of buggery. Buggery was a capital offence between 1533 and 1861 under UK law, although it rarely resulted in a death sentence. Importuning was an offer of sexual gratification between men, often for money. The Sexual Offences Act 1967 permitted sex between consenting men over 21 years of age when conducted in private, but the act specifically excluded public lavatories from being "private". The Sexual Offences Act 2003 replaced this aspect with the offence of "Sexual activity in a public lavatory" which includes solo masturbation.

In some of the cases where people were brought to court for cottaging, the issue of entrapment arose. Since the offences were public but often carried out behind closed lavatory doors, the police sometimes found it easier to use undercover police officers, who would frequent toilets posing as homosexuals in an effort to entice other men to approach them for sex. These men would then be arrested for importuning or soliciting and in some cases indecent assault.

Timeline of historic cases

Cultural response
 After the murder of playwright Joe Orton by his boyfriend Kenneth Halliwell in 1967, Orton's diaries were published and included explicit accounts of cottaging in London toilets. The diaries were the basis of the 1987 film Prick Up Your Ears and the play of the same name.
 The film Get Real was based on the 1992 play What's Wrong with Angry?, which features schoolboys cottaging as a key theme.
The 1992 play Porcelain by Singaporean-born playwright Chay Yew describes cottaging as a backdrop of violence between a gay Asian man and his white lover in a Bethnal Green lavatory.
 The Chinese film East Palace, West Palace, released in 1996, is centred on cottaging activity in Beijing.
The modern dance company, DV8, staged a piece  in 2003 called Men Who Have Sex With Men (MSM), which explicitly portrayed the theme of cottaging.
 Nicholas de Jongh's play Plague Over England was based on the arrest and conviction of John Gielgud for cottaging and premièred in 2008.

See also

 Cruising for sex
 Gay bathhouse
 Dogging

References

Citations

Sources 
 
 
 

British culture
Male homosexuality
Toilets
Casual sex
LGBT slang
Urinals